Jonathan Rafael Faña Frías (born 11 April 1987) is a Dominican former professional footballer who played as a forward.

Faña is the all-time international top goalscorer of the Dominican Republic national football team with 24 goals.

Club career
Faña began his career with Moca FC in the Dominican Republic, leading the Liga Mayor with 16 goals during the 2004/05 season.

He moved to TT Pro League power W Connection in 2006. Faña quickly established himself at the club and by 2007 was a regular starter, scoring 9 league goals during his first season as a regular starter and playing primarily as a left-sided attacking midfielder. During the 2008 TT Pro League campaign Faña led W Connection with 10 goals.

The 2009 season was Faña's most successful as he impressed at both the local league as well as in CONCACAF competitions.  He led W Connection to the 2009 CFU Club Championship helping defeat Puerto Rico Islanders 2–1 in the final on May 17, 2009 and claiming a spot in the CONCACAF Champions League 2009-10. Faña scored both Connection goals in the final and ended as the competition's top scorer with six goals. During the CONCACAF Champions League Faña appeared in seven matches scoring five goals, which included a hat trick on September 24, 2009 in a 3–0 road victory over Guatemalan side CSD Comunicaciones. As a result of his play in the Champions League Faña began to receive interest from Central and North American clubs, including Guatemalan club Xelajú MC.

Faña also helped W Connection capture the inaugural Trinidad and Tobago Goal Shield scoring twice in a 3–0 victory in the June 26, 2009 final versus Defence Force. Faña also finished as the competition's top scorer with five goals. During the 2009 TT Pro League Faña scored 10 goals and including Champions League, CFU Cup, and Goal Shield matches he ended the 2009 campaign with 26 goals in all competitions.

In February 2010 Faña was sent on loan to the Puerto Rico Islanders on a one-year deal with an option to buy when the 2010 USSF D2 Pro League season was over. After the missing the first few months of the season through injury, Faña made his debut for the Islanders on June 26, 2010 as a substitute in a 3–0 loss to the Rochester Rhinos. He remained with Puerto Rico for the 2011 season and was named Player of the Year by the club's fans.

Puerto Rico re-signed Faña for the 2012 season on November 9, 2011. After the Islanders organization went on hiatus in order to restructure, Faña signed with Dominican club Bauger FC in 2012, finishing the season as one of the league's top scorers and steering the club to a third-place finish in the league.  After spending a season in his homeland, Faña signed for Alianza F.C. of the Salvadoran Primera División.

On 11 December 2013, it was announced that Faña was returning to the North American Soccer League by signing for the San Antonio Scorpions.

International career
Faña debuted for the Dominican Republic national football team in 2006. He has scored 16 goals in 24 appearances with the national team, and appeared in Caribbean Nations Cup qualifying matches. On March 24, 2013 Faña scored the game-winning goal in a 3–1 victory over Haiti, the Dominican Republic's first-ever victory over their neighboring country.

International goals
As of match played 8 June 2016. Dominican Republic score listed first, score column indicates score after each Faña goal.

Honours

W Connection
 CFU Club Championship: 2006, 2009
 First Citizens Cup: 2006, 2007, 2008
 Pro League Big Six: 2007
 Digicel Pro Bowl: 2007
 Trinidad and Tobago Goal Shield: 2009

Puerto Rico Islanders
 USSF Division 2 Pro League: 2010
 CFU Club Championship: 2010, 2011

Moca FC
Liga Mayor Coca-Cola: 2014

 Bauger FC
 Liga Dominicana de Fútbol Regular Season Champions: 2015

Cibao FC
Copa Dominicana de Fútbol: 2015 Champions

 Atlético Pantoja

 CFU Club Championship: 2018

Individual
 Liga Mayor 2004–05 Top scorer – 16 goals
 2009 CFU Club Championship Top scorer – 6 goals
 2009 Trinidad and Tobago Goal Shield Top scorer – 5 goals
 2011 CFU Club Championship Top scorer - 4 goals
 2015 Liga Dominicana de Fútbol Top Scorer- 17 goals
 Copa Dominicana de Fútbol: 2015 Top Scorer - 15 goals

References

External links 
 
 edhdeportes.com 
    
 
 Jonathan Faña at ZeroZero

1987 births
Living people
Bauger FC players
Dominican Republic expatriate footballers
Dominican Republic expatriate sportspeople in the United States
Dominican Republic expatriate sportspeople in Puerto Rico
Dominican Republic expatriate sportspeople in Trinidad and Tobago
Dominican Republic footballers
Dominican Republic international footballers
Expatriate footballers in El Salvador
Expatriate footballers in Puerto Rico
Expatriate footballers in Trinidad and Tobago
Expatriate soccer players in the United States
North American Soccer League players
People from Espaillat Province
Puerto Rico Islanders players
San Antonio Scorpions players
TT Pro League players
USSF Division 2 Professional League players
W Connection F.C. players
Liga Panameña de Fútbol players
Association football forwards
Liga Dominicana de Fútbol players